Ali Hatami (August 14, 1944 – December 7, 1996) was an Iranian film director, screenwriter, art director, and costume designer. The Tehran Times dubbed him "the Hafez of Iranian cinema due to the poetic ambiance of his movies."

Career
Hatami graduated from the College of Dramatic Arts in Iran and subsequently began his professional career as a writer.

He made his feature film directorial debut with Hasan Kachal (Hasan the Bald) in 1970, which was the first Iranian musical film. He wrote and directed several films that focused on Iranian culture, including Hajji Washington (1982), Kamalolmolk (1984), and Love Stricken (1992). The Tehran Times dubbed him "the Hafez of Iranian cinema due to the poetic ambiance of his movies."

Hatami was also known for directing television series; he established a small production village—the Ghazali Cinema Town—to function as a set for historical productions, which he ultimately used to produce the popular television series Hezar Dastan (1978 to 1987). In 2006, Hezar Dastan was voted by the Association of Iranian Film and Television Critics as the best Iranian television series ever made.

Although his films did not attract international attention, the Iranian audience praised him. He often worked as the art director and costume designer of his own films.

He was honored in 2017 as the subject of the poster for the 35th Fajr International Film Festival.

Death 
Hatami's last film remained incomplete because of his death due to cancer, on December 7, 1996, in Tehran.

Personal life 
His parents were from Tafresh. He was married to Iranian actress Zari Khoshkam. Their daughter, Leila Hatami, also an actress, starred in the Academy Award-winning film A Separation.

Films
Hasan Kachal (1970)
Wood Pigeon (Toghi) (1970)
Baba Shamal (1971)
Sattar Khan (1972)
Ghalandar (1972)
Khastegar (1972)
Sooteh-Delan (1978)
Hajji Washington (1982)
Kamalolmolk (1984)
Jafar khan az farang Bargashteh (1984)
 Mother (1991)
Del Shodegan (1992)
Komiteh Mojazat (1997)
Takhti (1997)
Tehran Roozegare No (2008)

Television series
Rumi Story (1972)
Soltan-e Sahebgharan (1974)
Hezar Dastan (1978–1987)

References

External links

Iranian film directors
Iranian screenwriters
Iranian art directors
People from Tehran
People from Tafresh
People from Markazi Province
1944 births
1996 deaths
Deaths from cancer in Iran
Burials at artist's block of Behesht-e Zahra
20th-century screenwriters